or Chihara Brothers is a Japanese comedy duo (kombi) consisting of Chihara Junior (千原ジュニア) and Chihara Seiji (千原せいじ). Seiji and Junior are actual brothers. They are employed by Yoshimoto Kogyo, and are mainly active in Tokyo and Osaka. They have featured in films and television.

The duo formed in June 1989 when Seiji invited Junior, who dropped out of high school at the time to form a unit and become comedians at the Yoshimoto NSC in Osaka. The duo started official activities in 1990.

Members 
 Chihara Junior (千原ジュニア), Real name Kōji Chihara (千原浩史) Born March 30, 1974 in Fukuchiyama, Kyoto. Plays the boke and writes all their material.
 Chihara Seiji (千原せいじ), Real name Seiji Chihara (千原靖史) Born January 25, 1970 in Fukuchiyama, Kyoto. Plays the tsukkomi.

Media 
This list consists of only media appearances made by the duo Chihara Kyōdai when they appear together.

Current Television Programs
  (TV Asahi, 2013–)

Commercials
  (Mikakuto, 1994)
 "Graduation Trip" Campaign (Nippon Travel Agency, 1994)
 Uniqlo (1995)
 "Butayaki Udon" (Acecook, 1995)
 Toyota Rush (Toyota, 2008)
 Willcom, 2011

Movies
  (Director: Takashi Miike, 1997)
 Moon Child (Original: Gackt, 2003)
 Street Fighter: The Legend of Chun-Li (Voice-over dub, 2009)

References

External links 
 Official Profile on Yoshimoto Kogyo
 Official Profile on RANDC
 Chihara Kyōdai Official Homepage

Japanese comedy duos